Blastobasis leucozyga is a moth in the family Blastobasidae. It was described by Edward Meyrick in 1936. It is found in Venezuela.

References

Blastobasis
Moths described in 1936